Michael Hillegas (April 22, 1729 – September 29, 1804) was the first Treasurer of the United States.

Biography
Hillegas was born in Philadelphia, Pennsylvania. He was the son of Margaret Schiebenstock (1710 – July 21, 1770) and George Michael Hillegass (February 14, 1696 – October 30, 1749), an immigrant from Germany and a well-to-do merchant involved in iron and sugar.  Soon Michael thus had the freedom and resources to participate in local politics. He married Henrietta Boude on May 10, 1753, at Christ Church in Philadelphia, and they went on to have many children. Hillegas was a member of the Pennsylvania Provincial Assembly from 1765 to 1775 and served as treasurer of the Committee of Safety under Benjamin Franklin in 1774.

On July 29, 1775, Hillegas and fellow patriot George Clymer were appointed by the Continental Congress to share the office of Treasurer of the United Colonies. Because Hillegas edited the Declaration of Independence, when the Declaration of Independence was signed, Clymer's signature appeared on the document.

After Clymer's resignation on August 6, 1776, Hillegas assumed sole ownership of the office, which he held throughout the remainder of the American Revolution, using much of his own fortune to support the cause.  His son, Samuel Hillegas, was also given the authority to sign new currency, known as "Continentals." Hillegas also served briefly as quartermaster to the army and served on occasional commissions. On September 9, 1776, the Continental Congress officially changed the name of the country to the United States of America, but Hillegas's title did not officially change until March 1778. On September 11, 1789, Congress created the Treasury Department, and Alexander Hamilton took the oath of office as the first Secretary of the Treasury. On that same date, Hillegas tendered his resignation, and Samuel Meredith was appointed Treasurer.

Hillegas was also an early member of the American Philosophical Society, along with Franklin. He died in Philadelphia and is buried near Franklin in Christ Church Burial Ground.  Late in the 19th century, his descendants petitioned to have his portrait appear on the ten-dollar gold certificate in the series issued in the years 1907 and 1922.

See also

United States Department of the Treasury
River Bend Farm

References

External links
 The Michael Hillegas Papers, including personal and professional correspondence, are available for research use at the Historical Society of Pennsylvania.
1907-1922 Michael Hillegas gold certificate

1728 births
1804 deaths
Members of the Pennsylvania Provincial Assembly
Pennsylvania Dutch people
Treasurers of the United States
Politicians from Philadelphia
People of colonial Pennsylvania
American people of German descent
Patriots in the American Revolution
Burials at Christ Church, Philadelphia
Members of the American Philosophical Society